This is a list of casinos in the United States.

Lists by locale

City
List of Atlantic City casinos that never opened
List of Las Vegas casinos that never opened

State

Territory
 List of casinos in Puerto Rico
 List of casinos in the United States Virgin Islands

List of casinos

Organized by state

Organized by territories

See also
List of casinos
List of casinos in Canada
 List of defunct gambling companies
List of tourist attractions worldwide

References

External links